Macropodia formosa is a species of marine crab in the family Inachidae, found on seamounts and knolls in the west Indian Ocean, near St. Brandon and the Mozambican coast.

References

Majoidea
Crustaceans described in 1911